Unholy Anger is the first studio album from Those Who Fear. Facedown Records released the album on February 5, 2013.

Critical reception

Awarding the album three stars from HM Magazine, Tony D. Bryant states, "Unholy Anger is hard, fast, and everything the industry needs right now." Ian Webber, rating the album a seven out of ten at Cross Rhythms, says, "The quality of recording is first rate, adding excitement and atmosphere, but the unchanging rhythms, predictable breakdowns and lack of inventive spark hold this back from being a very good release. There is a potential here, but we may have to wait for future recordings for it to reveal itself."

Giving the album three stars for Jesus Freak Hideout, Michael Weaver writes, "Unholy Anger isn't bad, but I wouldn't necessarily classify it as 'good' either." Lee Brown, awarding the album four stars by Indie Vision Music, describes, "Those Who Fear bring a nonstop barrage of hardcore laced with bold lyrics and unrelenting conviction. Sonically, they are a potent blend of Living Sacrifice and For Today, with just a touch of In the Midst of Lions. Lyrically, Unholy Anger is an excursion into the depths of theology, yet is highly accessible. It’s easy to see why Facedown was eager to sign TWF".

Track listing

Personnel
Those Who Fear
John Healy - Vocals
Luke Healy - Guitar
Trevor Kope - Guitar
Josh Miller - Drums
Josh Ziegler - Bass

Additional musicians
Matthew Honeycut - Vocals
Carl Schwartz - Guest Vocals on track 2

Production
Justin Boyd - Photography
Joe Heidkamp - Composer, Vocal Producer
Doug High - Pre-Production
Dave Quiggle - Artwork, Layout, Photography
Josh Schroeder - Engineer, Mastering, Mixing

References

2013 debut albums
Those Who Fear albums
Facedown Records albums
Albums produced by Joey Sturgis